Osogbo Township Stadium is a multi-use stadium in Osogbo, Osun State, Nigeria. It is currently used mostly for football matches and is the home stadium of Prime F.C. and Ila Orangun FC. The stadium has a capacity of 10,000 people.

References

Football venues in Nigeria
Osogbo